Lady Wu: The First Empress, also known as The Great Empress or Empress Wu Meiniang, is a 2003 Chinese television series based on the biography of Wu Zetian, the only woman in Chinese history to assume the title of Empress Regnant. The series was first broadcast on CTS in Taiwan in 2003 under the Chinese title 武媚娘傳奇 (Wu Meiniang Chuanqi; literally: The Legend of Wu Meiniang).

Plot
This story revolves around the romance between Wu Meiniang and Li Junxian, a fictional Tang dynasty general. The series begins with Wu Meiniang's early life as a commoner, and ends with her ascension to the throne. It is set in the Zhenguan era of the reign of Emperor Taizong of Tang, and contains many significant historical events such as Wang Yingzhen's rebellion, the war between the Tang Empire and the Tujue, and the taming of the Yellow River.

Wu Meiniang is in love with Li Junxian, but she is the cairen of Emperor Taizong. Emperor Taizong's son Li Zhi is madly in love with Wu Meiniang. After Emperor Taizong's death, Li Zhi rescues her from being a nun for the rest of her life. Wu Meiniang is brought to the palace, where she encounters Consort Xiao, Empress Wang, and Xu Yingying who try to harm her. She is saved countlessly by Li Junxian and Li Zhi, and she eventually becomes the Empress.

Throughout the series Wu Meiniang is portrayed as a simple, intelligent and kind woman who persists in love at all costs. Although she is framed by her enemies, she has never been afraid of them. Because of her fate, she has experienced various kinds of love and hatred and has been involved in intrigues in the inner palace ever since she stepped in there. After the death of her two husbands and lover, she finally takes on the responsibilities of constructing her empire.

Cast
 Alyssa Chia as Wu Meiniang
 Vincent Zhao as Li Junxian
 Ji Tianfu as young Li Junxian
 Kou Zhenhai as Emperor Taizong of Tang
 Bao Jianfeng as Emperor Gaozong of Tang
 Sun Xing as Zhangsun Wuji
 Yang Tongshu as Xu Yingying
 Tian Zhong as Qian Xiaoduo
 Sze Yu as Duan Changde
 Zhang Guoqing as Jia Jinyuan
 Zhang Tong as Empress Wang
 Jessie Chang as Consort Xiao
 Zhang Mingjian as Di Renjie
 Yue Yueli as Wu Shiyue
 Dai Chunrong as Wu Meiniang's mother
 Wang Dongfang as Yuanbao
 Wu Qiang as Shiquan
 Ye Qing as Dongshi
 Fang Yuan as Ling Jing
 Ji Qilin as Li Yuanji
 Xu Shouqin as Shangguan Yi
 Li Li-chun as Yuan Tiangang
 Zhang Danlu as Shangguan Wan'er
 You Jin as Xiao Yu
 Hu Dagang as Tian Sheng
 Wei Yibo as Colonel Wang
 Yu Jianguo as Chuai Fantian
 Wang Ning as Shi Yaoqian

External links
  Lady Wu: The First Empress on Sina.com
  Lady Wu: The First Empress on xinhuanet.com
  Lady Wu: The First Empress page on CTS's website

2003 Chinese television series debuts
Television series set in the Tang dynasty
Television series set in the Zhou dynasty (690–705)
Works about Wu Zetian
Mandarin-language television shows
Chinese historical television series
Television series set in the 7th century
Cultural depictions of Wu Zetian
Cultural depictions of Di Renjie